The second USS Kangaroo (IX-121), an Armadillo-class tanker designated an unclassified miscellaneous vessel, was the second ship of the United States Navy to be named for the kangaroo, a family of herbivorous, leaping, marsupial mammals of Australia, New Guinea, and adjacent islands.  Her keel was laid down as Paul Tulane under Maritime Commission contract (T.  Z-ET1-S-C3) by Delta Shipbuilding Company, New Orleans, Louisiana, on 28 September 1943. She was renamed Kangaroo 27 October 1943, launched on 6 November 1943 sponsored by Mrs. Rufus C. Harris, acquired by the Navy on bareboat basis 17 December, and commissioned on 20 December.

Following shakedown in the Gulf of Mexico, Kangaroo departed Guantanamo Bay Naval Base on 24 January 1944, transited the Panama Canal on 28 January, and steamed to Noumea, New Caledonia, arriving 1 March. Assigned to the Service Force Pacific as a replacement for Stag (IX-128), she loaded fuel and supplies and departed for Guadalcanal on 21 March. Upon arrival 26 March, she commenced fueling operations, and for the next five months she replenishing ships in waters of the Solomon Islands.

Departing Tulagi on 10 September, she sailed to the Tonga Islands, received a cargo of fuel oil, and delivered her cargo at Noumea on 5 October. For seven months she served as a shuttle and station tanker, transporting bunker oil from the Fiji Islands and Tonga Islands to bases in the New Hebrides and New Caledonia. After a voyage to New Zealand for repairs, she departed Auckland on 6 June to load fuel oil at American Samoa. Subsequently, she conducted fueling operations in the Solomon Islands, Eniwetok, and the Western Caroline Islands before arriving Buckner Bay, Okinawa, on 14 August to resume duty as a station tanker.

While in the Pacific Kangaroo steamed over 20,000 miles (32,000 kilometers) and hauled more than 38,000,000 gallons (900,000 barrels, 144,000 cubic meters) of fuel oil and hundreds of drums of lubricating oil for fighting ships of the Navy. During her service she refueled more than 80 ships, including ten aircraft carriers, 34 destroyers, 20 troop transports, 12 cargo ships, and numerous merchantmen — not to mention storage barges, oilers, and tank farms.

Kangaroo departed Okinawa on 2 February 1946, for the United States.  Transiting the Panama Canal on 9 March, she put into Norfolk, Virginia, on 30 April after a six-week anchorage at Lynnhaven Roads and Hampton Roads.  Kangaroo decommissioned on 13 May, and the following day she was turned over to the Maritime Commission for disposal.

References 

Armadillo-class tankers
Unclassified miscellaneous vessels of the United States Navy
Ships built in New Orleans
1943 ships